HD 103079 is a class B4V (blue main-sequence) star in the constellation Musca. Its apparent magnitude is 4.89 and it is approximately 362 light years away from Earth based on parallax. It is a member of the Lower Centaurus–Crux subgroup of the Scorpius–Centaurus association, a group of predominantly hot blue-white stars that share a common origin and proper motion across the galaxy.

It has one reported companion with a magnitude of 7.41 and separation 1.549".

References

Musca (constellation)
B-type main-sequence stars
103079
Lower Centaurus Crux
057851
4549
PD-64 01724